Karak (Pashto: کرك) is the headquarters of Karak District in the Khyber Pakhtunkhwa province of Pakistan. It is 123  km from Peshawar on the main Indus Highway between Peshawar and Karachi. It is located at 33°7'12N 71°5'41E. Karak is said to be the single district in Pakistan that is inhabited by only one tribe of Pashtuns — the Khattaks.

Karak is a fast-growing city with just over 50,000 people. It is the second-largest city in Kohat Division and is the only urbanized area and namesake of Karak District. Karak's population nearly doubled between 1998 and 2017. The dominant language in the city is Pashto, which nearly everybody speaks. The city was first labeled an urban area between the 1972 and 1981 Pakistan censuses.

See also 

 List of cities in Khyber Pakhtunkhwa by population
 Kohat Division
 Hangu District
 Doaba
 Hangu
 Tall
 Karak District
 Kohat District
 Kohat
 Lachi
 Shakardara
 Kurram District
 Parachinar
 Sadda
 Orakzai District
 Pashto

References

Karak District
Populated places in Karak District